The 1981 Armenia mid-air collision occurred on 18 July 1981 when a Soviet Air Defense Forces Sukhoi Su-15 crashed into the tail of a Transporte Aéreo Rioplatense Canadair CL-44 commercial transport which had strayed into Soviet airspace over the Armenian Soviet Socialist Republic. The three crew and one passenger on the Argentine aircraft died; the Soviet pilot was able to eject to safety.

Background
Scotsman Stuart Allen McCafferty was hired to transport  of American-made tank spare parts and ammunition from Tel Aviv to Tehran, and had a Swiss partner, arms dealer Andreas Jenni. McCafferty allegedly approached numerous United States charter airlines, offering them US$175,000 (equivalent to $ today) to operate 15 flights which would carry "pharmaceuticals" between Israel and Iran, but none of them were interested. In June 1981, McCafferty travelled to Buenos Aires, where he persuaded Transporte Aéreo Rioplatense to charter him one of their CL-44 cargo aircraft.

After completing the first two round-flights from Tel Aviv to Tehran, via Larnaca in Cyprus, the airline was returning to Cyprus after having delivered the third tranche of cargo to Iran, when on 18 July 1981 the incident occurred. Before this incident, the Soviet Union had requested that Israel explain to it what was being transported on these cargo flights from Tel Aviv down the Turkish-Soviet border to Tehran. The Israel government ignored this request for information.

Incident

On its return flight from Tehran, the aircraft strayed off course. After heading towards the Turkish border, it strayed into Soviet airspace in the Azerbaijan Soviet Socialist Republic, which led the Soviets to scramble an Air Defense Forces Sukhoi Su-15 (NATO reporting name "Flagon") to intercept the aircraft. According to Soviet reports, the crew failed to respond to radio calls and visual signals from the pilot of the fighter aircraft. The crew of the CL-44 attempted to get away from the area, and the Soviet pilot directed his aircraft into the tail of the escaping aircraft, causing both aircraft to crash near Yerevan in the Armenian Soviet Socialist Republic. The Soviet fighter pilot managed to eject to safety, but the four occupants of the CL-44 – three Argentine crew and McCafferty, who had chartered the aircraft – died. Jenni, the arms dealer who procured the arms that had been delivered by the aircraft to Tehran, disputed these events, claiming that the aircraft was shot down  inside Turkish territory.

It is unclear whether the collision was intentional; the Soviet pilot said it was a deliberate attempt to down the enemy aircraft, while Western aviation experts examining his account believed he misjudged a turn and subsequently invented a story of self-sacrifice.

References

External links
 http://www.planecrashinfo.com/1981/1981-35.htm

1981 in Armenia
Aviation accidents and incidents in Armenia
Airliner accidents and incidents caused by pilot error
Aviation accidents and incidents in 1981
Mid-air collisions
Mid-air collisions involving airliners
Mid-air collisions involving military aircraft
1981 in the Soviet Union
Violations of Soviet airspace
Aviation accidents and incidents in the Soviet Union
Argentina–Soviet Union relations
July 1981 events in Asia
Iran–Contra affair
1981 disasters in the Soviet Union